Liinmaa Castle (Finnish: Liinmaan linna, Swedish: Vreghdenborg) was a medieval castle in Eurajoki in the province of Satakunta in Finland. The castle was made of wood and bricks, and only some earth walls remain today. According to excavations in the 1970s and 2004–2005, it was in usage during the 14th and 15th centuries. The site is lightly looked-after.

The castle was first mentioned in 1397 in a letter by Knut Bosson (Grip).

See also 
 Kokemäki Castle

External links
 Liinmaa Castle excavations 2005. Reconstructed 3D image of the castle; in Finnish.
 Information on the castle by the National Board of Antiquities of Finland; in Finnish.

Castles in Finland
Eurajoki
Buildings and structures in Satakunta
History of Satakunta